The 1969 Montana State Bobcats football team was an American football team that represented Montana State University in the Big Sky Conference during the 1969 NCAA College Division football season. In their second season under head coach Tom Parac, the Bobcats compiled a 1–8 record (0–4 against Big Sky opponents) and finished last out of five teams in the Big Sky.

Schedule

References

Montana State
Montana State Bobcats football seasons
Montana State Bobcats football